Lee Min-woo (born Lee Dong-min on March 15, 1976) is a South Korean actor. He began his career as a child actor in 1981, then starred as the titular lead character in the 1997 teen movie PpilKu. Lee has since appeared in numerous television series, notably the 2011 historical drama The Princess' Man.

Filmography

Television series
Little Women (2022) - Won Sang-woo Cameo 
Gunman in Joseon (KBS2 / 2014) - Emperor Gojong
Dating Agency: Cyrano (tvN / 2013) - Go Do-il
Wonderful Mama (SBS / 2013) - Lee Jang-ho
The Sons (MBC / 2013)
The Wedding Scheme (tvN / 2012) - Seo Jang-won
Drama Special "Girl Detective Park Hae-sol" (KBS2 / 2012) - Yoo Seok-won
Daddy's Sorry (TV Chosun / 2012) - Dong-sik
The Princess' Man (KBS2 / 2011) - Jung Jong
Detectives in Trouble (KBS2 / 2011) - Lee Dong-suk (guest appearance, ep 1-3)
Life Is Beautiful (SBS / 2010) - Lee Soo-il
Life Is Good (MBC / 2009-2010) - Kim Ki-wook / Kim Hyung-joo (guest appearance)
Hometown of Legends Ep. 6 "Gisaeng House Ghost Story" (KBS2 / 2008) - Hyo-rang 
Before and After: Plastic Surgery Clinic (MBC / 2008) - (guest appearance, ep 12)
M-Box (MBC Dramanet / 2008)
Merry Mary (MBC / 2007) - Seon Do-jin
MBC Best Theater "동쪽마녀의 첫 번째 남자" (MBC / 2007) - Young-woo
Pure in Heart (KBS1 / 2006-2007) - Hong Woo-kyung
Age of Warriors (KBS1 / 2003) - Jung Gyun, son of Jung Jung-bu 
Children in Heaven  (KBS2 / 2002) - Seo Yang-kil
Five Brothers and Sisters (SBS / 2002) - Kim Chang-min
Why Women? (SBS / 2001-2002) - Min-woo
Ladies of the Palace (SBS / 2001-2002) - Im Baek-ryung
MBC Best Theater "열병" (MBC / 2001) - Joon-ki
I Want To Keep Seeing You (SBS / 2000-2001) - Kim Eun-yeol
RNA (KBS2 / 2000) - Nam Woo-suk
New Nonstop (MBC / 2000) - Min-woo
Look Back in Anger (KBS2 / 2000) - Lee Dong-jin
Love Story Ep. 4 "Open Ended" (SBS / 1999-2000) - Sang-ho
Invitation  (KBS2 / 1999) - Kim Hyun-tae
Y2K (MBC / 1999) - Gong Jin-hyuk
KAIST (SBS / 1999-2000) - Lee Min-jae
My Love By My Side (KBS1 / 1998-1999) - Heo Se-chan
Shy Lovers (MBC / 1998)
70-Minute Drama "1997 LIFE" (SBS / 1997) - Sang-jin
Hometown of Legends "망자의 소원" (KBS2 / 1997)
Tears of the Dragon (KBS1 / 1996-1998) - Prince Yangnyeong
Start (KBS / 1996)
Hometown of Legends "사후절부야물" (KBS2 / 1996)
Dazzling Dawn (KBS1 / 1996) - Park Yeong-hyo
Star (MBC / 1996) - Jung-hoon
개성시대 (KBS / 1995)
Love Blooming in the Classroom (KBS2 / 1994)
Tale of Chunhyang (KBS / 1994) - Lee Mong-ryong
Han Myung-hoe (KBS2 / 1994) - Yeonsangun
When I Miss You (KBS / 1993) - Tae-hyun
The Sun and the Moon (KBS / 1993)
Dinosaur Teacher (SBS / 1993) - Min-woo
Freezing Point (KBS / 1990)
Our Paradise (MBC / 1990) - Chun-soo
O, Heaven (KBS / 1988-1989) - Jeongjo
Ggurugi (MBS / 1986) - Lee Han-sae
Silver Rapids (KBS1 / 1985) - 차돌
TV Literature "저승새" (KBS / 1984) - a boy monk
500 Years of Joseon (MBC / 1981) - Danjong

Film
Hill of Freedom (2014) - Ji Kwang-hyun
Our Sunhi (2013) - Sang-woo
Rush (1999) - Sang-jin
A+ Life (1999) - Yong-joon
A Mystery of the Cube (1998) - Duk-hee
PpilKu (1997) - Ppil-gu

Variety show
사기꾼들 (jTBC / 2012)

Theater
Romeo and Juliet (1998)

Awards
2011 KBS Drama Awards: Best Couple Award with Hong Soo-hyun (The Princess' Man)
1999 SBS Drama Awards: Special Award (KAIST)
1998 KBS Drama Awards: Excellence Award, Actor (Tears of the Dragon)
1995 Baeksang Arts Awards: Best New Actor, TV category (Tale of Chunhyang)
1994 KBS Drama Awards: Best Young Actor (When I Miss You, Han Myung-hoe, Tale of Chunhyang)
1985 Baeksang Arts Awards: Best Child Actor, TV category (TV Literature 저승새)
1984 KBS Drama Awards: Best Child Actor (TV Literature 저승새)

References

External links
 Lee Min-woo Fan Cafe at Daum
 
 
 

21st-century South Korean male actors
South Korean male child actors
South Korean male television actors
Living people
1976 births
South Korean male film actors
South Korean male stage actors
Chung-Ang University alumni
Best New Actor Paeksang Arts Award (television) winners